Thornby is a village in Cumbria, England.

References

Villages in Cumbria
Allerdale